is a railway station located in Shiokari (塩狩), Wassamu, Kamikawa District, Hokkaidō, Japan and is operated by the Hokkaidō Railway Company.

Lines Serviced
JR Hokkaidō
Sōya Main Line

Adjacent stations

External links
Ekikara Time Table - JR Shiokari Station (Japanese)

Railway stations in Hokkaido Prefecture
Railway stations in Japan opened in 1924